Since Colorado became a U.S. state in 1876, it has sent  congressional delegations to the United States Senate and United States House of Representatives. Each state elects two senators to serve for six years, and members of the House to two-year terms. Before becoming a state, the Colorado Territory elected a non-voting delegate at-large to Congress from 1861 to 1876.

These are tables of congressional delegations from Colorado to the United States Senate and the United States House of Representatives.

Current delegation
Colorado's current congressional delegation to the  consists of two senators, both of whom are Democrats, and eight representatives comprising five Democrats and three Republicans.

United States Senate

United States House of Representatives
The State of Colorado gained an  beginning in 2023.

United States Senate

United States House of Representatives

1861–1876: 1 non-voting delegate 
Starting on August 19, 1861, the Territory of Colorado sent a non-voting delegate to the House.

1876–1893: 1 seat 
Following statehood on August 1, 1876, the State of Colorado was granted one seat in the House.

1893–1903: 2 seats 
Following the  1890 census, Colorado was apportioned with two seats.

1903–1913: 3 seats 
Following the 1900 census, Colorado was apportioned with three seats.

1913–1973: 4 seats 
Following the 1910 census, Colorado was apportioned with four seats.

1973–1983: 5 seats 
Following the 1970 census, Colorado was apportioned with five seats.

1983–2003: 6 seats 
Following the 1980 census, Colorado was apportioned with six seats.

2003–2023: 7 seats 
Following the 2000 census, Colorado was apportioned with seven seats.

2023–present: 8 seats 
Following the 2020 census, Colorado was apportioned with eight seats.

Key

See also 

List of United States congressional districts
Colorado's congressional districts
Political party strength in Colorado

References 

 
 
Colorado
Politics of Colorado
Congressional delegations